Anitelea "Andy" Tuilagi (born 5 June 1986) is a Samoan international rugby union player. His position is either centre or wing. He is part of the famous Tuilagi rugby family, with his older brothers Henry, Freddie, Alesana, and younger brothers Vavae and Manu all also having played international rugby.

He has played club rugby for Leicester Tigers, in the Aviva Premiership, and a season loan at Leeds Tykes, now Yorkshire Carnegie, in National Division One. Tuilagi made his Leicester début at Welford Road against Gloucester as a replacement.

Following a loan period at Leeds, Tuilagi ended his contract with Leicester Tigers to join Yorkshire Carnegie full-time.

On 19 August 2008 Tuilagi was confirmed as the last signing that would be joining Guinness Premiership side Sale Sharks on a four-year contract.

On 13 June 2011 Sale Sharks announced that Tuilagi had been released from his contract after three years and on 29 November 2011 he joined Newport Gwent Dragons. He made his debut against Glasgow Warriors on 4 December 2011. He left Newport Gwent Dragons at the end of the 2012-13 season after turning down a new contract. On 8 May 2014, Antielea returned to England as signed for Newcastle Falcons in the Aviva Premiership on a two-year contract from the 2014-15 season, where he will join with his brother, Alesana Tuilagi.

International career
Tuilagi became the youngest player to play for Samoa at aged 19 years and 27 days when he made his debut in July 2005 against Tonga, where he scored a try to also become the youngest player ever to score for Samoa.

He was named in the 2007 Rugby World Cup squad, but was forced out of the tournament through injury. Since then he has been dropped out of favour in international rugby, his last call up coming in 2014 after 5 years out of the side.

References

External links
Leeds profile
Sale profile
Manu Samoa supporters website
Newport Gwent Dragons squad

1986 births
Living people
Dragons RFC players
Expatriate rugby union players in England
Expatriate rugby union players in Wales
Leeds Tykes players
Leicester Tigers players
Rugby union centres
Rugby union wings
Sale Sharks players
Samoa international rugby union players
Samoan sportspeople
Samoan expatriate rugby union players
Samoan expatriate sportspeople in England
Samoan expatriate sportspeople in Wales
Samoan rugby union players
Sportspeople from Apia
Tuilagi family